The 1878 Stevens football team was an American football team that represented Stevens Institute of Technology in the 1878 college football season. The team compiled a 1–1–2 record and was outscored by a total of four goals to one. The team played its home games at the St. George's Cricket Club grounds in Hoboken, New Jersey.

Schedule

Game summaries

Princeton
On October 26, at 2:30 p.m., the Princeton football team played a football match against Stevens Institute of Technology and (with some participation from members of the St. George's Cricket Club). The game was played between teams of 15 players per side on the Princeton University grounds before a large crowd, including many carriages parked in the space outside the ropes. Princeton scored four goals and six touchdowns.  Stevens did not score.

The lineup for Stevens Institute was as follows: Spofford, Rosenbury, Dilworth, Clarke, Leib, Rosenberger, Denton, Dashill and Suydam as forwardss; Merritt, Connover, and Herrick as halfbacks; and Hysop, Pracay, and Moore as backs.  Merritt was the Stevens team captain.

Rutgers
On October 30, the team from Stevens Institute played a match against the Rutgers College team in New Brunswick, New Jersey. The game ended in a scoreless tie with neither side scoring a goal or touchdown.

Columbia
On November 5, Stevens was scheduled to play a match against the team from the College of the City of New York (CCNY) at St. George's Cricket Club grounds in Hoboken, New Jersey. The CCNY club did not show up, but a group of nine students from Columbia arrived and agreed to a "scratch game". Sides were chosen among the available players by Herrick of Stevens and Burton of Columbia. Burton's team scored three touchdowns, but neither team scored a goal.

Rutgers
On November 9, at 3:00 p.m., Stevens hosted Rutgers for a return match on the St. George's Cricket Club grounds. Neither team scored a touchdown or goal in the first or second halves. The sides agreed to an additional 10 minutes. Reisenberger recovered the ball beyond Rutgers' goal line for a touchdown, and Suydam kicked the goal giving Stevens the victory by one goal to none.

The lineup for Stevens included Muller, Gowen, Ruh, Macauley, and Hasbrouck at the forward positions, Howe, See and Randolph at the halfback positions, and Voorhees and Norris as backs. Randolph was the team captain.

References

Stevens
Stevens Tech Ducks football seasons
Stevens football